Le Lavandou is a seaside commune in the Var department in the Provence-Alpes-Côte d'Azur region in Southeastern France. In 2019, it had a population of 5,985. Le Lavandou derives its name either from the flower lavender (lavanda in Provençal) that is prevalent in the area, or more prosaically from the local form of the Occitan name for lavoir, lavandor (for lavador, a public place for washing clothes).

The (then) village is where the famous popular song A Nightingale Sang in Berkeley Square was written in the summer of 1939. The words were by Eric Maschwitz and the music by Manning Sherwin, with its title ‘stolen’ from a story by Michael Arlen.  The song had its first performance in a local bar, where the melody was played on piano by Manning Sherwin with the help of the resident saxophonist.  Maschwitz sang the words while holding a glass of wine, but nobody seemed impressed.

In the spring of 2002, an attempt was made to find the bar where this classic song was first performed with the view to having a blue plaque set up.  With the help of the local tourist office, elderly residents were questioned, but it proved impossible to establish the venue.

In September 2000, the mayor passed an unusual bylaw making it illegal to die in the town.  The mayor described his own bylaw as "absurd ... to counter an absurd situation"; the "absurd situation" was that with the town's cemetery already full, a court in Nice had denied permission for a new cemetery because it would mar the beauty of the selected site.

Demographics

Twin towns – sister cities
Le Lavandou has been twinned with Kronberg, Germany since 1973.

Events
 Lavandou Flower Parade
 Saint-Pierre festival
 Romérage
 Summer season concerts
 Halloween | Fall Festival

Beaches

 L'Anglade
 La Grande Plage du Lavandou
 Saint-Clair
 La Fossette
 Aiguebelle
 l'Eléphant
 Jean Blanc
 Rossignol
 Le Layet
 Cavalière
 Cap Nègre
 Pramousquier

See also
Communes of the Var department

References

External links
 Official website of Tourist Information
Official Home Page
Informations : le Lavandou and Bormes les Mimosas

Communes of Var (department)